Francis is a town in Pontotoc County, Oklahoma, United States. The population was 332 at the 2000 census.

Geography
Francis is located at  (34.873148, -96.591552).

Climate

Demographics

As of the census of 2000, there were 332 people, 139 households, and 97 families residing in the town. There were 155 housing units at an average density of 264.8 per square mile (101.4/km2). The racial makeup of the town was 81.93% White, 12.65% Native American, 0.30% Asian, and 5.12% from two or more races. Hispanic or Latino of any race were 1.51% of the population.

There were 139 households, out of which 30.9% had children under the age of 18 living with them, 51.1% were married couples living together, 15.8% had a female householder with no husband present, and 30.2% were non-families. 28.1% of all households were made up of individuals, and 10.8% had someone living alone who was 65 years of age or older. The average household size was 2.39 and the average family size was 2.89.

In the town, the population was spread out, with 23.5% under the age of 18, 8.7% from 18 to 24, 27.1% from 25 to 44, 26.5% from 45 to 64, and 14.2% who were 65 years of age or older. The median age was 40 years. For every 100 females, there were 88.6 males. For every 100 females age 18 and over, there were 85.4 males.

The median income for a household in the town was $25,083, and the median income for a family was $26,094. Males had a median income of $25,417 versus $18,393 for females. The per capita income for the town was $12,826. About 13.9% of families and 17.1% of the population were below the poverty line, including 6.8% of those under age 18 and 16.2% of those age 65 or over.

Notable person
 Frank W. Davis, Oklahoma State Representative

References

External links
 "Traveling the Rails in Grand Style" – vintage photos of a Fred Harvey lunchroom in Francis
 Encyclopedia of Oklahoma History and Culture - Francis

Towns in Pontotoc County, Oklahoma
Towns in Oklahoma